The following is an alphabetical list of journalists from the Asian country of Sri Lanka.

A–M

 Chathura Alwis
 M. H. M. Ashraff
 Iqbal Athas
 Nisthar Cassim
 Ernest Corea
 Premakeerthi de Alwis
 Harold de Andrado
 Edmund de Livera
 Mervyn de Silva
 Sampath Lakmal de Silva
 Armand de Souza
 Richard de Zoysa
 P. Devakumaran
 Prageeth Eknaligoda
 S. J. Emmanuel
 Basil Fernando
 Susitha R. Fernando
 Vijita Fernando
 Thevis Guruge
 Tim Horshington
 I. M. R. A. Iriyagolla
 Isaipriya
 Victor Ivan
 Balanadarajah Iyer
 K. Natesa Iyer
 Frederica Jansz
 Sirilal Kodikara
 Suresh and Ranjith Kumar
 Buddhika Kurukularatne
 Champika Liyanaarachchi
 Charles Ambrose Lorensz
 Mariathas Manojanraj
 S. P. Mylvaganam

N–Z

 Aiyathurai Nadesan
 Manusha Nanayakkara
 Mylvaganam Nimalrajan
 Maunasami Parameswaree
 K. S. Raja
 Selvarajah Rajivarnam
 Subramaniam Ramachandran
 Dushy Ranetunge
 Premil Ratnayake
 Elmo Rodrigopulle
 Relangi Selvarajah
 Seelaratna Senarath
 Regi Siriwardena
 Sinnathamby Sivamaharajah
 Taraki Sivaram
 Subramaniyam Sugirdharajan
 Chandrabose Suthaharan
 J. S. Tissainayagam
 Lal Wickrematunge
 Lasantha Wickrematunge
 Edwin Wijeyeratne

See also

 List of Sri Lankan people
 List of Sri Lankan writers
 Lists of journalists
 Media of Sri Lanka

Sri Lankan
Journalists